Agonopterix melanarcha is a moth in the family Depressariidae. It was described by Edward Meyrick in 1913. It is found in South Africa.

References

Endemic moths of South Africa
Moths described in 1913
Agonopterix
Moths of Africa
Taxa named by Edward Meyrick